Charity Intelligence Canada (Ci) is a registered charity that does charity assessments of over 750 Canadian charitable organizations, to allow donors be informed when they donate to charities, and to promote transparency, accountability, and results focus in the charitable sector.

About
Charity Intelligence Canada (Ci) was launched in 2007. The group "follows and rates fundraisers." CTV News described Ci as is an "organization that monitors other charities to measure the impact they actually have with the donations they collect". Ci's mission is to help "provide Canadian donors with information that helps them make informed and intelligent giving decisions to have the greatest impact.

In 2020, MoneySense used data from the "third-party watchdog Charity Intelligence Canada" and Canada Revenue Agency in compiling their own top 100 charities list.

In an interview with the Globe and Mail, Charity Intelligence Canada's managing director, Kate Bahen, who formerly worked as a "Bay Street equity analyst", said that people who give to charities are well-intentioned, but they "often under-examine" the "effectiveness" of their giving. "Despite the best of intentions, the effectiveness of our giving is often underexamined", says Kate Bahen, managing director of Charity Intelligence Canada, which provides detailed reports on Canadian charities. The Globe described the "Toronto-based research organization"—which "provides detailed reports on Canadian charities"—as a "leading source of information on the real-world impact of Canadian giving". The Globe said that Ci "watchdog group...analyzes charities' financial activities on behalf of large donors." Behen said that Charity Intelligence Canada takes a "strict definition of impact...determined by a cost-benefit analysis, looking at the demonstrated positive effect of every dollar you donate." The "impact-driven approach has become the centre of a philanthropic movement known as "effective altruism", that is part of the "new frontier in charity evaluation", according to Behen.

Organizations that have received a high ranking use this as part of their fund-raising and in their press releases.

In the media

In their May 2016 article, the Globe and Mail reported that Ci's Kate Bahen had been "alarmed when she first saw the Red Cross's early reports on its Lac-Mégantic spending". She said that a "rapid response to distributing large sums of cash is critical, noting studies of disasters have shown that having a sense of financial security quickly after a crisis is the single largest determinant in how well people bounce back emotionally from disasters." and therefore recommended that "would-be donors support local community charities in Fort McMurray and Edmonton, saying local groups were the most impressive in their quick response in both Lac-Mégantic and the Alberta floods." The Red Cross had received $14.8-million following the 2013 Lac-Mégantic train explosion, but only issued "$300,000 on an emergency basis to local residents in the first month after the disaster". By May 9, As it Happens, the Red Cross had collected close to $60 million in private donations which did not include "funds matched by both governments."

Maclean's referenced Ci in ranking its interactive list of the top 100 charities in Canada.

The Globe and Mail interviewed Ci's manager for their article on the efficacy of charitable giving in Canada.

CBC News cited Charity Intelligence Canada in their 2019 report on Canada's professional sports teams, such as the National Hockey League (NHL). The Ci suggested donors investigate more fully before giving to pro-sports charities, "citing lack of transparency, high fundraising costs and excessive cash reserves as reasons."

In a ZoomerMedia November 24, 2019 interview, Behen described how CI measures the impact of a charity by weighing the cost of delivering the program against the value on the social benefit produces. When asked why so few cancer charities had the 4-star rating for a high impact charity, Behan said that well-known successful cancer charities have a lower impact rating because they are spending much more on fund-raising while holding on to donations instead of spending enough on charitable work.

Following the start of the 2020 We Charity controversy, We Charity including its relationship with the for profit Me to We came under scrutiny. CBC's The Current and Canadaland both interviewed Charity Intelligence regarding the organization's concerns about We Charity, which were identified prior to the We Charity controversy.

Competition for skilled managers

In a June 23, 2014 interview with The Ottawa Citizen, Greg Thomson, who is Charity Intelligence Canada's research director, says that the "large, complex" organizations in the charity sector—such as the United Way and hospital foundations—that can employ over 100 people and can raise ten of millions of dollars, are better served by hiring two or three of the "best fundraisers" to lead their organizations and their salaries of $350,000 or more reflects the value of those people who have "sophisticated skills" that would be very highly compensated in the private sector. He also said that "charities are not like governments that are required by law to publish high salaries under so-called sunshine laws." Imagine Canada's interim president, Cathy Barr, agreed with Thomson and said that these individuals with expertise in IT and finance—many of which have PhDs—are sought after by "government and the private sector", as well as "hospitals, universities, arts organizations" with fundraising "goals in the multi-millions....If they don’t pay competitive salaries, they won't attract the staff with the skills they need. Or if they do attract them, they'll have trouble retaining them."

See also
 Candid
Charity Navigator
 Charity assessment
 Charity fraud
 CharityWatch
 GiveWell

References

External links
 

Organizations established in 2007
Charity review websites
2007 establishments in Canada
Auditors